Bagadhar Brahma Kishan College (B.B. Kishan College) is located at Jalahghat in the newly formed district of Baksa under BTAD, Assam. It was founded following a public initiative in 1978 to provide higher education to the underprivileged boys and girls of the Jalah block, which is situated in the north-eastern corner of the Baksa district near the Bhutan border, and populated mostly by scheduled tribes and other native communities (+/- 92%). It was originally called Kishan College. In 1982, it was renamed to Bagadhar Brahma Kishan College after its benefactor who is an uneducated tribal social worker. Jalah is a low literacy neighborhood (1991: 40.34%, 2001: 54.45%), especially in female literacy (1991: 30.51%, 2001: 45.51%).

The college, being the first of four in Assam, has aided the local yeomen. In 1979–1980, it began with the two year Associate of Arts program with permission from Gauhati University and subsequently concurrent support from the Government of Assam. It opened its Bachelor of Arts program in 1983 and 1984, adding Gauhati University's affiliation in 1986. In the same year, it also came under the Deficit Grants-in-Aid program of the Government of Assam and the 'Assam Aided College Management Rules, 1976', which was later superseded by the 'Assam Non-Government College Management Rules, 2001'. In 1990, it got University Grants Commission (UGC) recognition under Section 2f and 12B. The same year, it was permanently affiliated to Gauhati University.

To this day, the mission of B.B. Kishan College is to provide access to education to the economically and educationally deprived sections of the society and women in particular, emphasizing social accountability and responsiveness to the multi-ethnic, multi-cultural and multi-lingual communities of its catchment. 'Help, serve, reflect and learn' is its motto.

Mission of the college
The primary goals of B.B. Kishan College are as follows: To make sure that higher education facilities are available to the economically and educationally disadvantaged sections of the Jalah block, consisting mainly of the ST and OBC. To facilitate the empowerment of women through higher education; To make extension and awareness programs part of the regular curricular activities, and to foster a spirit of entrepreneurship and self-employment among the students through vocational courses and self-help groups. The regular curricular courses, a few self-financing courses and a large number of co-curricular and extra-curricular activities considerably reflect the mission, vision and goals of the college.

Academics 

The current student enrollment is 334 at the Degree level (47% female; ST: 57%, SC: 1% and OBC: 35%). As to the self-financing computer courses, 35 have signed up for them. The faculty consists of 26 (5 female/21 male) permanent and 11 (all male) temporary (against non-sanctioned posts) teachers. All instructors also teach the Higher Secondary course offerings. Of the 26 permanent teachers one is a PhD, 11 (3 female + 8 male) M.Phil. and 12 PhD.C. Supporting this faculty is the administrative staff, 12 (1 female + 11 male) members including the Principal and Librarian. The Degree calendar is annual and the college has a six-day week, the daily schedule being 9.15am to 4.30. The number of teaching days a year is +/- 175. The language of instruction is Assamese/English. Due to economic and sociocultural reasons like early marriage of girls, the drop-out rate is very high. Moreover, the number of students who clear TDC I and/or II is less and not many students take up the TDC III finals. The pass percentage was 65.9% and 69% in two successive years.

Humanities

 HSSLC (Higher Secondary School Leaving Certificate) or (10+2)

Bachelor of Arts
 B.A in Assamese
 B.A in Bodo
 B.A in English
 B.A in Sanskrit
 B.A in History
 B.A in Philosophy
 B.A in Education
 B.A in Economics
 B.A in Mathematics
 B.A in Political Science
 B.A in Statistics

Self Financed Courses

 Certificate Courses
 Spoken English
 Yoga and Meditation
 Computer Application

 Diploma Courses
 Computer Application (6 months)

Infrastructure and learning resources 

The college has a 10-acre campus. It is situated at Jalahghat, close to the Bhutan border, skirted on two sides by River Kaldiya, a tributary of the Brahmaputra.

On the ground stands a large Assam-type building flanked by two wings containing classrooms, the Principal's office, administrative office, committee room, conference hall, library, girls' common room, computer centre, and a number of other centres and cells. The academic departments are all housed in an annex at the back. The boys' and girls' hostels and 4 quarters mark the rear of the campus. In between are a fish pond, plantation patches, and land waiting to be used for infrastructure extension. In front, on the ground there is a large cycle and two-wheeler parking lot (donated by the Alumni Association to the teachers and the non-teaching staff) on one side and a newly built canteen on the other. The construction of the boys' common room is in progress. The toilets are mostly outside these two buildings. In front of the main building, there are gardens on both sides and a flag stands at the centre. A water supply system that was installed proved useful during the floods when water submerged a part of the college ground. However, the existing built-up space is not sufficient to run the educational programmes that include the Higher Secondary courses (though not within the scope of the NAAC visit), run along with the TDC requiring large classrooms. For the expansion that is everyday becoming indispensable, the college plans to generate funds from sources like fishery, farming, mushroom, vermicompost, photocopying facility, computer education, etc. The college is also trying to raise donations.

Organization and management 

The college is governed by a 12-member Governing Body consisting of the local MLA as the President, the Principal as the ex officio Member-Secretary, the Vice-Principal ex officio member, nominees of the university and the State Government, a woman-member, a donor-member and representatives of teachers and non-teaching employees of the college. There are about 12 committees/cells/units to plan and monitor the academic, administrative, financial, cultural, welfare and extension activities of the college.

References

2.https://dajobb.com/bb-kishan-college-merit-list/

Universities and colleges in Assam
Colleges affiliated to Gauhati University
1978 establishments in Assam
Educational institutions established in 1978
Baksa district